Randy Dickison (died 1996) was a high diver who made attempts at the world record high dive.

Dickison attended Phillips Junior High School in Minneapolis, Minnesota with fellow future high diver Dana Kunze. In 1982 he executed a  dive and landed head first. He attempted to set the high diving world record in 1985 with a  dive at Ocean Park Hong Kong, but fractured multiple bones of his left leg in the attempt.

Dickison died during a stunt dive into a giant sponge in Belgium in 1996.

References

External links
 Video of Dickison's Hong Kong world record attempt

1996 deaths
Year of birth missing
American male divers
Diving deaths
Male high divers
Sport deaths in Belgium
Sportspeople from Minnesota